The Zimbabwe cricket team toured Australia in August and September 2022 to play three One Day International (ODI) matches. The ODI series formed part of the inaugural 2020–2023 ICC Cricket World Cup Super League. Zimbabwe last toured Australia in the 2003–04 cricket season to play two Test matches and an ODI tri-series along with India. In May 2022, Cricket Australia confirmed the fixtures for the tour, with all the matches taking place at the Riverway Stadium in Townsville.

Background
Originally, the fixtures were scheduled to be played in June 2020, but they were moved to early August 2020 by Cricket Australia. The revised dates clashed with the inaugural season of The Hundred in England, with several Australian cricketers initially expected to take part in the tournament. However, The Hundred was postponed to 2021 due to the COVID-19 pandemic. The pandemic also put Zimbabwe's tour to Australia in doubt, but on 28 May 2020, Cricket Australia confirmed the fixtures for the series. The series was put into further doubt in June, after Cricket Australia announced several cost-saving measures. On 20 June 2020, Cricket Australia's interim Chief Executive Officer, Nick Hockley, said that getting clarity on the status of the tour was on his priority list. However, on 30 June 2020, the tour was postponed due to the pandemic.

In February 2022, Zimbabwe Cricket were looking at the possibility of playing the matches later that year, with the addition of three Twenty20 International (T20I) matches or a Test match.

Squads

Zimbabwe Cricket also named Tanaka Chivanga and John Masara as reserves. Josh Inglis was added to Australia's squad after the first ODI in place of Mitchell Marsh.

ODI series

1st ODI

2nd ODI

3rd ODI

References

External links
 Series home at ESPN Cricinfo

2020 in Australian cricket
2022 in Australian cricket
2020 in Zimbabwean cricket
2022 in Zimbabwean cricket
International cricket competitions in 2022
Zimbabwean cricket tours of Australia
Cricket events postponed due to the COVID-19 pandemic